The Potnia Theron (lit. "The Animal Queen") or Lady/Queen of Animals is a widespread motif in ancient art from the Mediterranean world and the ancient Near East, showing a central human, or human-like, female figure who grasps two animals, one to each side. Although the connections between images and concepts in the various ancient cultures concerned remain very unclear, such images are often referred to by the Greek term Potnia Theron regardless of culture of origin.

The term is first used once by Homer as a descriptor of Artemis and often used to describe female divinities associated with animals. The word Potnia, meaning mistress or lady, was a Mycenaean Greek word inherited by Classical Greek, with the same meaning, cognate to Sanskrit .

The oldest such depiction, the Seated Woman of Çatalhöyük, is a clay sculpture from Çatalhöyük in modern Turkey, made c 6,000 BC. This motif is more common in later Near Eastern and Mesopotamian art with a male figure, called the Master of Animals.
Homer's mention of Potnia Theron refers to Artemis; Walter Burkert describes this mention as "a well established formula". An Artemis-type deity, a "Mistress of the Animals", is often assumed to have existed in prehistoric religion and often referred to as Potnia Theron with some scholars positing a relationship between Artemis and goddesses depicted in Minoan art.

An early example of Italian Potnia theròn is in the Museo civico archeologico di Monte Rinaldo  in Italy: a plate illustrates a goddess that wears a long dress and holds hands with two lionesses.

In the Aeneid, Virgil mentions that inside of Psychro's Cave, in Crete, lived the goddess Cybele whose chariot was drawn by two lions.

See also

Master of Animals
Inara (goddess)
Iphigenia

References

Further reading
 Douglas Van Buren, E. "Italian fictile antefixes of the Πότνια θηρῶν". In: Revue des Études Anciennes. Tome 24, 1922, n°2. pp. 93–100. DOI: Italian fictile antefixes of the Πότνια θηρῶν; www.persee.fr/doc/rea_0035-2004_1922_num_24_2_2200
 Kourou, Nota. "Potnia figures and cults in early Iron Age Aegean and Cyprus". In: Cahiers du Centre d'Etudes Chypriotes. Volume 45, 2015. Hommage à Jacqueline Karageorghis. pp. 181–199. DOI: Potnia figures and cults in early Iron Age Aegean and Cyprus; www.persee.fr/doc/cchyp_0761-8271_2015_num_45_1_1633

Animal goddesses
Archaeological sources on Greek mythology
Artemis
Greek goddesses
Iconography
Minoan religion
Women in art